Zdenko Škrabalo (4 August 1929 – 12 January 2014) was a Croatian academician and diplomat and former foreign minister of Croatia.

After finishing high school in his home town of Sombor, Škrabalo enrolled at the University of Zagreb School of Medicine, and graduated in 1953, where he also received a doctorate with a thesis on disorders of endocrine glands. He attended several seminars around Germany, and he founded the first German laboratory for the cytopathology of endocrine glands. He also attended seminars at medical schools in London, Leuven, Boston and Toronto. In 1976 he became full professor at the Zagreb University School of Medicine. He was also a guest lecturer at universities in Dacca, Boston, Hamburg, Frankfurt and Valletta.

Škrabalo also worked for the World Health Organization as an advisor to various bodies concerned with diabetes treatment. He is notable for being the first researcher who described the parasitic disease piroplasmosis in humans and his later research was concerned with thyroid pathology, andrology and diabetes. He authored over 250 research articles and is a member of numerous Croatian and international physicians' associations. He is also a member of the Croatian Academy of Sciences and Arts since 1992.

Škrabalo became engaged in politics in the early 1990s, and between 1991 and 1992 he was advisor to the President of Croatia Franjo Tuđman for dealing with specialised agencies of the United Nations. From 1992 to 1993 he was appointed Minister of Foreign Affairs, and after that he served as Croatia's ambassador to Switzerland and Liechtenstein (1993–1995). In 1995 he was awarded the honorary title of professor emeritus of the University of Zagreb and from 1996 to 2000 he served as ambassador to Hungary. In 2000 Škrabalo went into retirement.

His younger brother Ivo Škrabalo was also active in Croatian politics, but in the Croatian Social Liberal Party.

On 12 January 2014, he died at Zagreb.

References

1929 births
2014 deaths
Croatian endocrinologists
Croatian Democratic Union politicians
Croatian diplomats
Ambassadors of Croatia to Hungary
Ambassadors of Croatia to Switzerland
Ambassadors of Croatia to Liechtenstein
School of Medicine, University of Zagreb alumni
Academic staff of the University of Zagreb
Members of the Croatian Academy of Sciences and Arts
Foreign ministers of Croatia
Politicians from Sombor
Yugoslav endocrinologists